Diuris purdiei, commonly known as Purdie's donkey orchid, is a species of orchid that is endemic to the south-west of Western Australia. It has between five and ten leaves at its base and up to eight pale yellow flowers with reddish-brown or purplish markings. It mainly grows in swampy areas and only flowers after fires the previous summer.

Description
Diuris purdiei is a tuberous, perennial herb with between five and ten spirally twisted leaves in a tuft near its base. There are two ridge-like calli  in the centre of the labellum near its base. Flowering occurs in September and October.

Taxonomy and naming
Diuris purdiei was first formally described in 1903 by Ludwig Diels from a specimen collected near Cannington, and the description was published in Journal and Proceedings of the Mueller Botanic Society of Western Australia. The specific epithet (purdiei) honours the New Zealand born academic, Alex Purdie who collected the type specimen.

Distribution and habitat
Purdie's donkey orchid grows in winter-wet swamps under dense shrubs and is found between Perth and Yarloop in the Jarrah Forest and Swan Coastal Plain biogeographic regions.

Conservation
Diuris purdiei is classified as "endangered" under the Australian Government Environment Protection and Biodiversity Conservation Act 1999 and as "Threatened Flora (Declared Rare Flora — Extant)" by the Department of Environment and Conservation (Western Australia). The population of this orchid has been fragmented by urbanisation and the current threats to the species are habitat loss and weed invasion.

References

purdiei
Endemic orchids of Australia
Orchids of Western Australia
Endemic flora of Western Australia
Plants described in 1903
Taxa named by Ludwig Diels